Totonacapan is defined by the following municipalities in the states of Veracruz, Puebla, and Hidalgo (Valderrama Rouy 2005:188-189).

Veracruz
There is a total of 17 municipalities in the part of Veracruz comprising the Totonacapan region.

Puebla
There is a total of 58 municipalities in the part of Puebla comprising the Totonacapan region.

Hidalgo
There is a total of 1 municipality in the part of Hidalgo comprising the Totonacapan region.

References

Valderrama Rouy, Pablo. 2005. In Sandstrom, Alan R., and Enrique Hugo García Valencia. 2005. Native peoples of the Gulf Coast of Mexico. Tucson: University of Arizona Press.

See also
 Totonac
 Totonac language

Geography of Veracruz
Geography of Puebla
Geography of Hidalgo (state)